Aglaja Veteranyi (1962–2002) was a Swiss writer of Romanian origin, from a family of Romanian and Hungarian descent. She was born in Bucharest but eventually settled in Switzerland with her family of touring circus performers. She is best known for her novel Why the Child Is Cooking in the Polenta. 

She ended her life in 2002 by drowning herself in Lake Zurich.

Awards
 2000, Adelbert von Chamisso Prize

References

1962 births
2002 suicides
Writers from Bucharest
Romanian people of Hungarian descent
Suicides by drowning in Switzerland
Swiss writers
Swiss women writers
Romanian emigrants to Switzerland